Football Federation of Cherkasy Oblast (FFCHO) is a football governing body in the region of Cherkasy Oblast, Ukraine. The federation is a  collective member of the Football Federation of Ukraine.

Created in 1954 as part of the Soviet Ukraine, the region conducts its own football competitions including championship and cup competition. Before 1954, some teams competed and won football competitions of the Kyiv Oblast Football Federation.

The region's main professional football team is FC Dnipro Cherkasy which throughout years several times has dissolved and later revived. The recent reorganization took place in 2018 and turned the club into Cherkashchyna–Akademiya. The club moved out of the city of Cherkasy to suburbs where is located its farm club. Beside Dnipro, Cherkasy Oblast also was represented at professional level by its regional titles record holder FC Lokomotyv Smila. Among other notable clubs in oblast there was Temp Cherkasy (played in 1970-80s) and FC LNZ-Lebedyn (near Shpola).

The region's main football arena is the Central City Stadium in Cherkasy, which was built in 1957 when the main football team obtain its status of team of masters (professional team).

Previous Champions

1954    FC Torpedo Cherkasy
1955    FC Dynamo Cherkasy
1956    FC Kolhospnyk Cherkasy
1957    FC Kolhospnyk Cherkasy (2)
1958    Soviet Army Officers' Club (DOSA) Cherkasy
1959    FC Shakhtar Vatutine
1960    FC Spartak Uman
1961    FC Shakhtar Vatutine (2)
1962    FC Lokomotyv Zolotonosha
1963    FC Shakhtar Vatutine (3)
1964    FC Lokomotyv Smila
1965    FC Lokomotyv Smila (2)
1966    FC Lokomotyv Smila (3)
1967    FC Lokomotyv Smila (4)
1968    FC Lokomotyv Smila (5)
1969    FC Lokomotyv Smila (6)
1970    FC Lokomotyv Smila (7)
1971    FC Lokomotyv Smila (8)
1972    FC Fotoprylad Cherkasy
1973    FC Lokomotyv Smila (9)
1974    FC Lokomotyv Smila (10)
1975    FC Zorya Uman
1976    FC Khimik Cherkasy
1977    FC Khimik Cherkasy (2)
1978    FC Temp Cherkasy
1979    FC Temp Cherkasy (2)
1980    FC Avanhard Smila
1981    FC Traktor Chyhyryn
1982    FC Khimik Cherkasy
1983    FC Tiasmyn Smila
1984    FC Temp Cherkasy (3)
1985    FC Kolos Heronymivka
1986    FC Temp Cherkasy (4)
1987    FC Torpedo Cherkasy (2)
1988    FC Torpedo Cherkasy (3)
1989    FC Temp Korsun-Shevchenkivskyi
1990    FC Spartak Zolotonosha
1991    FC Kolos Heronymivka (2)
=independence of Ukraine=
1992    FC Rotor Cherkasy
1993    FC Enerhetyk Chyhyryn
1994    FC Nyva-Naftovyk Korsun-Shevchenkivskyi
1995    FC Lokomotyv Smila (11)
1996    FC Nyva-Naftovyk Korsun-Shevchenkivskyi (2)
1997    FC Nyva Drabiv
1998    FC KKhP Talne
1999    FC Talne (2)
2000    FC Drabiv (2)
2001    FC Kolos Chornobai
2002    FC Kolos Chornobai (2)
2003    FC Kolos Chornobai (3)
2004    FC Nyva-Zlatokrai Zolotonosha Raion
2005    FC Khodak Cherkasy
2006    FC Khodak Cherkasy (2)
2007    FC Tiasmyn-Hazovyk Kamianka
2008    FC Khodak Cherkasy (3)
2009    FC Shpola-LNZ-Lebedyn
2010    FC Kholodnyi Yar Kamianka
2011    FC Shpola-LNZ-Lebedyn (2)
2012    FC Zorya Biloziria
2013    FC Zorya Biloziria (2)
2014    FC Zorya Biloziria (3)
2015    UTK Yatran Palanka
2016    FC LNZ-Lebedyn (3)
2017    FC LNZ-Lebedyn (4)
2018    FC UTK Uman Raion (2)
2019    FC Altayir Drabiv
2020    FC Zlatokrai-2017 Zolotonosha Raion

Top winners

 11 - FC Lokomotyv Smila
 4 - FC Temp Cherkasy
 4 - FC (Shpola)-LNZ-Lebedyn
 3 - 5 clubs (Shakhtar V., Torpedo Ch., Kolos Ch., Khodak Ch., Zorya)
 2 - 7 clubs (UTK, Drabiv, Talne, Nyva-Naftovyk, Kolos H., Kolhospnyk, Khimik Ch.)
 1 - 18 clubs

Winners

Cup winners

1954    FC Rafzavod Cherkasy
1955    FC Kharchovyk Smila
1956    FC Burevisnyk Cherkasy
1957    FC Kolhospnyk Cherkasy
1958    Soviet Army Officers' Club (DOSA) Cherkasy
1959    FC Spartak Shpola
1960    FC Harnizon Cherkasy
1961    FC Avanhard Smila
1962    FC Shakhtar Vatutine
1963    FC Avanhard Smila
1964    FC Shakhtar Vatutine
1965    FC Kharchovyk Smila
1966    FC Shakhtar Vatutine
1967    FC Lokomotyv Smila
1968    FC Avanhard Smila
1969    FC Lokomotyv Smila
1970    FC Khimik Cherkasy
1971    FC Avanhard Uman
1972    FC Lokomotyv Smila
1973    FC Lokomotyv Smila
1974    FC Fotoprylad Cherkasy
1975    FC Lokomotyv Smila
1976    FC Lokomotyv Smila
1977    FC Fotoprylad Cherkasy
1978    FC Khimik Cherkasy
1979    FC Tiasmyn Smila
1980    FC Khimik Cherkasy
1981    FC Tiasmyn Smila
1982    FC Tiasmyn Smila
1983    FC Tiasmyn Smila
1984    FC Tiasmyn Smila
1985    FC Kolos Heronymivka
1986    FC Kolos Heronymivka
1987    FC Temp Cherkasy
1988    FC Avanhard Smila
1989    FC Tiasmyn Smila
1990    FC Rotor Cherkasy
1991    FC Rotor Cherkasy
1992    FC Rotor Cherkasy
1993    FC Khimik Cherkasy
1994    FC Lokomotyv Smila
1995    FC Lokomotyv Smila
1996    FC Lokomotyv Smila
1997    FC KKhP Budivelnyk Talne
1998    FC Universytet-SDYuShOR Cherkasy
1999    FC Lokomotyv Smila
2000    FC Kolos Chornobai
2001    FC Ikar Uman Raion
2002    FC Yatran-Ikar Uman Raion
2003    FC Yatran Uman Raion
2004    FC Nyva-Zlatokrai Zolotonosha Raion
2005    FC Zlatokrai Zolotonosha Raion
2006    FC Avanhard Monastyryshche
2007    FC Khodak Cherkasy
2008    FC Kholodnyi Yar Kamianka
2009    FC Khodak Cherkasy
2010    FC Zorya Biloziria
2011    FC Umanfermash
2012    FC Zorya Biloziria
2013    FC Zorya Biloziria
2014    FC Zorya Biloziria
2015    FC Retro Vatutine
2016    
2017

Professional clubs
 FC Dnipro Cherkasy (Kolhospnyk, Hranit, Cherkasy), 1958-1971, 1974, 1977-1984, 1988-2002, 2003-2009, 2020-2021
 
 FC Lokomotyv Smila, 1996-1999
 FC Cherkashchyna (Slavutych Cherkasy, Cherkaskyi Dnipro), 2011-2021
 FC LNZ Cherkasy, 2021-

See also
 FFU Council of Regions

References

External links
 Official website

Football in the regions of Ukraine
Football governing bodies in Ukraine
Sport in Cherkasy Oblast